Wilhelmus Marinus Antonius Jansen (28 October 1946 – 25 January 2022) was a Dutch professional football player and manager.

As a midfielder or defender, he spent most of his career at Feyenoord, winning honours including the European Cup in 1970. He earned 65 international caps with the Dutch national team and played in the teams that reached the 1974 and 1978 FIFA World Cup finals.

Jansen served in several roles at Feyenoord, including winning the KNVB Cup in consecutive seasons as manager in the early 1990s. He also won the Scottish Premier Division at Celtic in 1997–98.

Club career

He spent most of his playing career with his hometown team, Feyenoord, between 1965 and 1980. At Feyenoord, Jansen won four League Championships, one Dutch Cup, one UEFA Cup in 1974, and the European Cup in 1970 when Feyenoord defeated Celtic 2–1 in Milan. He scored once in the 1969–70 European Cup campaign, opening a 2–0 home win over A.C. Milan in the second leg of the second round, as Feyenoord overturned a 1–0 loss from the first game. He was the captain of their 1974 team which defeated Tottenham Hotspur 4–2 on aggregate.

After a brief spell in the North American Soccer League with the Washington Diplomats, he moved to Feyenoord's rivals Ajax, where he won a league title in 1981–82. His debut for Ajax was against his former club in De Kuip in December 1980; a fan of Feyenoord threw an icy snowball at Jansen's eye during warming-up which finally resulted in Jansen being substituted within 20 minutes into the game.

Dutch teammate Johan Cruyff considered Jansen to be one of only four men worth paying attention to when they spoke about football.

International career
Jansen earned his first of 65 caps for the Netherlands on 4 October 1967, in a 2–1 loss away to Denmark in UEFA Euro 1968 qualifying. He scored his only international goal in his eighth game on 4 September 1968, a 2–0 win over Luxembourg in his hometown for 1970 FIFA World Cup qualification.

Jansen played all seven games as the Dutch finished runners-up to hosts West Germany at the 1974 FIFA World Cup, and repeated the feat in 1978 as they lost to hosts Argentina. He committed the foul on Bernd Hölzenbein in 1974 which allowed Paul Breitner to equalise with a penalty as the Germans came from behind to beat the Dutch. He also played both games of their bronze-medal finish at UEFA Euro 1976 in Yugoslavia.

Managerial career
Jansen began his managerial career at his old club Feyenoord, where he worked as a coach, and then as assistant manager, between 1983 and 1987. He also had a season as manager of Belgian club SC Lokeren. In 1991, he returned to Feyenoord as manager, winning the KNVB Cup in 1991. The result was a surprise as the club had been near bankruptcy in the preceding years.

The team also won the cup in 1992 and reached the semi-finals of the UEFA Cup Winners' Cup in 1991–92. He became Technical Director in 1992, and his old teammate, Willem van Hanegem coached the team to the league in 1993 and the Dutch Cup again the following season. Jansen disagreed with van Hanegem's physical tactics, and argued with chairman Jorien van den Herik when the coach was given a contract extension. He left to work as assistant manager of Saudi Arabia alongside compatriot Leo Beenhakker, and also managed Japanese side Sanfrecce Hiroshima, where he struggled with the language.

On 3 July 1997, Wim Jansen was appointed head coach of Celtic, replacing the sacked Tommy Burns. He was their first manager from outside Great Britain and Ireland, and only the second to have never played for the club. He went on to guide them to their first Scottish league championship in ten years, ending the hopes of rival Rangers to win a tenth consecutive championship. Despite winning the league and the Scottish League Cup during his only season in charge, Jansen left the club less than 48 hours after the title was secured as he was unable to work with general manager Jock Brown. His most notable transfer was the signing of Henrik Larsson from Feyenoord.

At the beginning of the 2008–09 season, Jansen took up the position of assistant to the head coach of the Feyenoord first team, Gertjan Verbeek. He resigned in solidarity when the coach was fired in 2009.

Personal life and death

Jansen was given a Latin name, as is the custom for Dutch Catholics, because his family lived with Catholics in the first year of his life. He and his family were not religious, and he would practice kicking a ball at a pole on Sundays while all his neighbours were at church. As a child, he lived on the same street (Bloklandstraat) as Feyenoord teammate Coen Moulijn.

Jansen lived in Hendrik-Ido-Ambacht from the 1970s. In late 2021, he released the biography Meesterbrein ("Mastermind"), written alongside Yoeri van den Busken.

Jansen died of complications from dementia on 25 January 2022 at the age of 75. His funeral was held four days later at Feyenoord's De Kuip stadium.

Career statistics

Club

International

Honours

Player

Feyenoord
 Eredivisie: 1964–65, 1968–69, 1970–71, 1973–74
 KNVB Cup: 1968–69
 European Cup: 1969–70
 Intercontinental Cup: 1970
 UEFA Cup: 1973–74

Ajax
 Eredivisie: 1981–82

Netherlands
 FIFA World Cup runner-up: 1974, 1978
 UEFA European Championship third place: 1976

Manager
Feyenoord
 KNVB Cup: 1990–91, 1991–92

Celtic
 Scottish Premier Division: 1997–98
 Scottish League Cup: 1997–98

References

External links

1946 births
2022 deaths
Dutch footballers
Netherlands international footballers
Dutch expatriate footballers
Feyenoord players
Feyenoord managers
AFC Ajax players
Dutch football managers
Celtic F.C. managers
1974 FIFA World Cup players
UEFA Euro 1976 players
1978 FIFA World Cup players
Footballers from Hendrik-Ido-Ambacht
Footballers from Rotterdam
Eredivisie players
North American Soccer League (1968–1984) players
Washington Diplomats (NASL) players
J1 League managers
Sanfrecce Hiroshima managers
Expatriate soccer players in the United States
Dutch expatriate football managers
Expatriate football managers in Belgium
Expatriate football managers in Japan
Expatriate football managers in Scotland
Dutch expatriate sportspeople in Belgium
Dutch expatriate sportspeople in Japan
Dutch expatriate sportspeople in Scotland
Dutch expatriate sportspeople in the United States
Scottish Football League managers
Association football midfielders
UEFA Champions League winning players
UEFA Cup winning players
Deaths from dementia in the Netherlands